John Walter Thomson Jr. (1913–2009) was a Scottish-born American botanist and lichenologist, sometimes referred to as the "Dean of North American Lichens".

Biography
When he was eight years old, Thomson moved with his family to the U.S.A. In 1935 he graduated from Columbia University with a bachelor's degree, majoring in botany and zoology. At the University of Wisconsin–Madison (UW Madison) he graduated in botany with a master's degree in 1937 and a Ph.D. in 1939. After receiving his Ph.D., he worked as a naturalist at Manhattan's American Museum of Natural History and taught at Brooklyn College until 1942. During WW II, he taught topics in military aviation and meteorology from 1942 to 1944 for the U.S. Army Air Corps at Superior State Teachers College (now named the University of Wisconsin–Superior). In 1944 he became a faculty member of the department of botany at University of Wisconsin–Madison, retiring there in 1984 as professor emeritus. In retirement, he continued to work almost daily at the Madison campus until he was about 88 years old.

Thomson taught for many summers at the University of Minnesota's Itasca Biological Station and Laboratories campus, which is located on Lake Itasca. He collected lichens not only in the Arctic and in Wisconsin, but also in a number of other U.S. states, including "California, Florida, Indiana, Oklahoma, New York, Pennsylvania, and Washington". He was the author or coauthor of over 100 scientific articles. He accumulated an extremely valuable herbarium of lichens, which gave the Wisconsin State Herbarium at UW Madison perhaps the world's best lichen collection of North American and Arctic material.

In 1937 in Madison, Wisconsin, Thomson married the botanist and conservationist Olive Sherman. Upon his death he was survived by his widow, three sons, Dennis, Norman, and Roderic, a daughter, Elizabeth, and seven grandchildren. Another son, Douglas E. Thomson, M.D., died in 1978 at age 34. As a memorial to Douglas their dead son, John and Olive Thomson gave money to The Nature Conservancy for land acquisition, leading to the establishment of the Thomson Memorial Prairie, which consists of "323 acres of remnant dry prairie". Dennis Thomson and his wife Joan Schurch Thomson donated land to the nonprofit conservation organization The Prairie Enthusiasts, which created the 193-acre preserve named Schurch-Thomson Prairie.

Awards and honors
 1958–1959 — President of the American Bryological and Lichenological Society 
 1985 — Henry Allan Gleason Award of the New York Botanical Garden
 1985 — Gulf Oil Conservation Award jointly given to John and Olive Thomson for their environmental activity
 1992 — Acharius Medal of the International Association for Lichenology
 1998 — Festschrift held in honor of Thomson's 85th birthday with published volume Lichenographia Thomsoniana (1998)
 2010 — John Thomson Research Award established by the Botanical Club of Wisconsin

Selected publications

Articles

Books and monographs

See also
 :Category:Taxa named by John Walter Thomson

References

External links
 
Citation for 1992 Acharius Medal by Irwin Murray Brodo

1913 births
2009 deaths
British emigrants to the United States
20th-century American botanists
21st-century American botanists
American lichenologists
Columbia University alumni
University of Wisconsin–Madison College of Letters and Science alumni
University of Wisconsin–Madison faculty
Acharius Medal recipients